Annona manabiensis is a species of plant in the Annonaceae family. It is endemic to Ecuador.  Its natural habitat is subtropical or tropical dry forests. It is threatened by habitat loss.

References

manabiensis
Endemic flora of Ecuador
Critically endangered plants
Taxonomy articles created by Polbot